Poul Hartling (14 August 1914 – 30 April 2000) was a Danish politician and diplomat. He was leader of Venstre from 1965 to 1977, and served as Prime Minister of Denmark from 1973 to 1975. Prior to that, he served as foreign minister from 1968 to 1971 under Hilmar Baunsgaard. From 1978 to 1985, he served as the United Nations High Commissioner for Refugees.

Career

Hartling graduated in theology 1939, became ordained as a priest, and later headed a teacher's seminary. He was a member of parliament 1957–1960, and again 1964–1977, and party leader 1965–1977. Hartling served as Foreign Minister of Denmark from 1968 until 1971 in the Cabinet of Hilmar Baunsgaard. Hartling was Prime Minister from 1973 until 1975. In the chaotic situation with many new parties after the 1973 Danish parliamentary election his single party minority government commanded only 22 out 179 seats in parliament. In social policy, Hartling's time as Prime Minister witnessed the passage of the Social Assistance Act of 1974, which instructed municipal authorities to provide day-care and recreation centres for children and young people.

Hartling then left Danish politics to work for the United Nations. He was the United Nations High Commissioner for Refugees (UNHCR) from 1978 until 1985. In 1981 Hartling accepted the Nobel Peace Prize on behalf of the UNHCR.

Hartling died 30 April 2000 in Copenhagen. He is buried with his wife Elsebeth in Hørsholm.

References

Bibliography
 

1914 births
2000 deaths
Prime Ministers of Denmark
Danish Lutherans
Foreign ministers of Denmark
Members of the Folketing
United Nations High Commissioners for Refugees
Politicians from Copenhagen
20th-century Danish politicians
Grand Crosses 1st class of the Order of Merit of the Federal Republic of Germany
Grand Crosses of the Order of the Dannebrog
Danish officials of the United Nations
20th-century Lutherans
Leaders of Venstre (Denmark)